"All the Roadrunning" is a song written and performed by Mark Knopfler featuring American country singer Emmylou Harris. It was first released as a new track on Knopfler's career spanning compilation Private Investigations and as a CD single in 2005. Some months later, in April 2006, the song was also released on the album of the same title.

Success and critical acclaim
"All the Roadrunning was a successful hit, peaking at #8 in the UK. It's also the only UK top 10 hit of Mark Knopfler's solo career.  The reviews were positive as well. Allmusic described the new song on the 2005 compilation as "nice" and "beautiful", as well as a song that "keeps the line of continuity and excellence in perspective." Hybridmagazine describes the song as having a "celtic folk melody" and as "accented by delicate mandolin and soaring fiddle strains, while the lyrics are a wistful account of life on the road that finds the lead character taking stock of the sacrifices and benefits of roaming."

Charts

Live performances
The song was never played live by Knopfler alone, but in couple with Harris, it was a staple of the eponymous album's tour.

References

2005 songs
Country rock songs